Frat Rock! The Greatest Rock 'n' Roll Party Tunes of All-Time is a compilation album released by Rhino Records in 1988, featuring "frat rock" songs from the 1950s and 1960s.  Different volumes of Frat Rock! were released on vinyl and CD both before and after this release.

Track listing

1988 compilation albums
Rhino Records compilation albums
Garage rock compilation albums